Phyllonorycter gigas is a moth of the family Gracillariidae. It is known from Honshu island of Japan.

The wingspan is about 11 mm.

References

gigas
Moths of Japan

Taxa named by Tosio Kumata
Moths described in 1963